Geoffrey Everest Hinton  (born 6 December 1947) is a British-Canadian cognitive psychologist and computer scientist, most noted for his work on artificial neural networks. Since 2013, he has divided his time working for Google (Google Brain) and the University of Toronto. In 2017, he co-founded and became the Chief Scientific Advisor of the Vector Institute in Toronto.

With David Rumelhart and Ronald J. Williams, Hinton was co-author of a highly cited paper published in 1986 that popularised the backpropagation algorithm for training multi-layer neural networks, although they were not the first to propose the approach. Hinton is viewed as a leading figure in the deep learning community. The dramatic image-recognition milestone of the AlexNet designed in collaboration with his students Alex Krizhevsky and Ilya Sutskever for the ImageNet challenge 2012 was a breakthrough in the field of computer vision.

Hinton received the 2018 Turing Award, together with Yoshua Bengio and Yann LeCun, for their work on deep learning. They are sometimes referred to as the "Godfathers of AI" and "Godfathers of Deep Learning", and have continued to give public talks together.

Education
Hinton was educated at King's College, Cambridge, graduating in 1970 with a Bachelor of Arts in experimental psychology. He continued his study at the University of Edinburgh where he was awarded a PhD in artificial intelligence in 1978 for research supervised by Christopher Longuet-Higgins.

Career and research
After his PhD, he worked at the University of Sussex and, (after difficulty finding funding in Britain), the University of California, San Diego and Carnegie Mellon University. He was the founding director of the Gatsby Charitable Foundation Computational Neuroscience Unit at University College London and  a professor in the computer science department at the University of Toronto. He holds a Canada Research Chair in Machine Learning and is currently an advisor for the Learning in Machines & Brains program at the Canadian Institute for Advanced Research. Hinton taught a free online course on Neural Networks on the education platform Coursera in 2012. Hinton joined Google in March 2013 when his company, DNNresearch Inc., was acquired. He is planning to "divide his time between his university research and his work at Google".

Hinton's research investigates ways of using neural networks for machine learning, memory, perception and symbol processing. He has authored or co-authored over 200 peer reviewed publications. At the Conference on Neural Information Processing Systems (NeuRIPS) 2022, Hinton introduced a new learning algorithm for neural networks that he calls the "Forward-Forward" algorithm. The idea of the new algorithm is to replace the traditional forward-backward passes of backpropagation with two forward passes, one with positive (i.e. real) data and the other with negative data which could be generated by the network itself.

While Hinton was a professor at Carnegie Mellon University (1982–1987), David E. Rumelhart and Hinton and Ronald J. Williams applied the backpropagation algorithm to multi-layer neural networks. Their experiments showed that such networks can learn useful internal representations of data. In an interview of 2018, Hinton said that "David E. Rumelhart came up with the basic idea of backpropagation, so it's his invention." Although this work was important in popularising backpropagation, it was not the first to suggest the approach. Reverse-mode automatic differentiation, of which backpropagation is a special case, was proposed by Seppo Linnainmaa in 1970, and Paul Werbos proposed to use it to train neural networks in 1974.

During the same period, Hinton co-invented Boltzmann machines with David Ackley and Terry Sejnowski. His other contributions to neural network research include distributed representations, time delay neural network, mixtures of experts, Helmholtz machines and Product of Experts. In 2007 Hinton coauthored an unsupervised learning paper titled Unsupervised learning of image transformations. An accessible introduction to Geoffrey Hinton's research can be found in his articles in Scientific American in September 1992 and October 1993.

In October and November 2017 respectively, Hinton published two open access research papers on the theme of capsule neural networks, which according to Hinton are "finally something that works well."

Notable former PhD students and postdoctoral researchers from his group include Peter Dayan, Sam Roweis, Max Welling, Richard Zemel, Brendan Frey, Radford M. Neal, Yee Whye Teh, Ruslan Salakhutdinov, Ilya Sutskever, Yann LeCun, Alex Graves, and Zoubin Ghahramani.

Honours and awards

Hinton was elected a Fellow of the Royal Society (FRS) in 1998. He was the first winner of the Rumelhart Prize in 2001. His certificate of election for the Royal Society reads: 

In 2001, Hinton was awarded an honorary doctorate from the University of Edinburgh. He was the 2005 recipient of the IJCAI Award for Research Excellence lifetime-achievement award. He has also been awarded the 2011 Herzberg Canada Gold Medal for Science and Engineering. In 2013, Hinton was awarded an honorary doctorate from the Université de Sherbrooke.

In 2016, he was elected a foreign member of National Academy of Engineering "For contributions to the theory and practice of artificial neural networks and their application to speech recognition and computer vision". He also received the 2016 IEEE/RSE Wolfson James Clerk Maxwell Award.

He has won the BBVA Foundation Frontiers of Knowledge Award (2016) in the Information and Communication Technologies category "for his pioneering and highly influential work" to endow machines with the ability to learn.

Together with Yann LeCun, and Yoshua Bengio, Hinton won the 2018 Turing Award for conceptual and engineering breakthroughs that have made deep neural networks a critical component of computing.

In 2018, he was awarded a Companion of the Order of Canada. In 2022 he received the Princess of Asturias Award in the category "Scientific Research", along with Yann LeCun, Yoshua Bengio, and Demis Hassabis.

Personal life

Hinton is the great-great-grandson of the mathematician and educator Mary Everest Boole and her husband, the logician George Boole, whose work eventually became one of the foundations of modern computer science. Another great-great-grandfather was the surgeon and author James Hinton, who was the father of Charles Howard Hinton. Hinton's father was Howard Hinton. His middle name comes from another relative, George Everest. He is the nephew of the economist Colin Clark. He lost his second wife to ovarian cancer in 1994.

Views
Hinton moved from the U.S. to Canada in part due to disillusionment with Ronald Reagan-era politics and disapproval of military funding of artificial intelligence.

Hinton has petitioned against lethal autonomous weapons. Regarding existential risk from artificial intelligence, Hinton typically declines to make predictions more than five years into the future, noting that exponential progress makes the uncertainty too great.

Hinton is optimistic about AI’s impact on the job market: “The phrase ‘artificial general intelligence’ carries with it the implication that this sort of single robot is suddenly going to be smarter than you. I don’t think it’s going to be that. I think more and more of the routine things we do are going to be replaced by AI systems — like the Google Assistant.” 

Hinton argues that AGI won't make humans redundant. Rather, he says, it will remain for the most part myopic in its understanding of the world – at least in the near future. He believes that it’ll continue to improve our lives in small but meaningful ways. "[AI in the future is] going to know a lot about what you’re probably going to want to do and how to do it, and it’s going to be very helpful. But it’s not going to replace you," he said. "If you took [a] system that was developed to be able to be very good [at driving], and you sent it on its first date, I think it would be a disaster." And for dangerous tasks currently performed by humans, that's a step in the right direction, according to Hinton.

References

Artificial intelligence researchers
British computer scientists
Canadian computer scientists
Companions of the Order of Canada
Fellows of the Association for the Advancement of Artificial Intelligence
Fellows of the Royal Society
Google employees
Living people
Machine learning researchers
Academic staff of the University of Toronto
Canada Research Chairs
1947 births
Carnegie Mellon University faculty
Rumelhart Prize laureates
Alumni of the University of Edinburgh
Fellows of the Cognitive Science Society
Turing Award laureates
People from Wimbledon, London
Foreign associates of the National Academy of Engineering
Hinton family
Canadian Fellows of the Royal Society